Born Talking: A Personal Inquiry into Language is a 1990 BBC television documentary series, written and presented by Jonathan Miller, that attempts to shed light on the complexities of language.

Episodes
The series consists of four episodes, which run 47 minutes each:
 Doing What Comes Naturally: Childhood Language Acquisition
 Broken English: The Effects of Brain Damage on Language
 Lending a Hand: Sign Languages and the Deaf
 In a Manner of Speaking: The Phenomenon of Conversation

External links 
 The Born Talking Series – Available in the US and Canada

Sign language television shows
1990s British documentary television series
1990 British television series debuts
1990 British television series endings